North Kuta, (Indonesian: Kecamatan Kuta Utara) is a district in Badung Regency of Bali, Indonesia.

It lies just north of Kuta District and west of Denpasar city.  It covers 33.86 square kilometres, and had a population of 103,775 as of 2010 Census, having seen the heaviest brunt of suburbanization of all districts in the decade up to 2010 as the region was formerly mostly uninhabited fields. However the population then declined somewhat to 95,189 at the 2020 Census.

It contains 6 desa/kelurahan (villages), listed below with their areas and their populations at the 2010 Censu and 2020 Census.

References

External links
 Map of Badung Regency showing districts, triangular section just north of Kuta is Kuta North

Districts of Bali